Bryant Creek (also known as Bryant River) is a stream in the Ozarks of Missouri. Bryant Creek has headwaters just west of Lead Hill and southeast Cedar Gap in southwestern Wright County and flows in a southeasterly direction through Douglas County east of Ava and joins the North Fork River in Ozark County just north of Tecumseh and within the waters of Norfork Lake. Tributaries include Bill Macks Creek, Hunter Creek, Rippee Creek, Fox Creek, Brush Creek, Spring Creek and Pine Creek.
 
Bryant Creek has the name of a pioneer citizen who arrived in the area in the 1830s.

See also
List of rivers of Missouri

References

Rivers of Douglas County, Missouri
Rivers of Ozark County, Missouri
Rivers of Wright County, Missouri
Rivers of Missouri
Bodies of water of the Ozarks